Colubrariidae are a taxonomic family of medium-sized sea snails, marine gastropod mollusks in the superfamily Buccinoidea.

This family has no subfamilies.

Genera
 Axifex S.-I Huang & M.-H. Lin, 2019
 Bartschia Rehder, 1943
 Colubraria Schumacher, 1817
 Cumia Bivona-Bernardi, 1838
 Cyclimetula S.-I Huang & M.-H. Lin, 2019
 Iredalula Finlay, 1926
 Kanamarua Kuroda, 1951
 Metula H. Adams & A. Adams, 1853
 Minibraria Sarasúa, 1984
Genera brought into synonymy
 Acamptochetus Cossmann, 1901: synonym of Metula H. Adams & A. Adams, 1853
 Agassitula Olsson & Bayer, 1972: synonym of Metula H. Adams & A. Adams, 1853
 Antemetula Rehder, 1943: synonym of Metula H. Adams & A. Adams, 1853
 Antimitra Iredale, 1917: synonym of Metula H. Adams & A. Adams, 1853
 Colubrarina Kuroda & Habe, 1971: synonym of Metula H. Adams & A. Adams, 1853
 Epidromus Mörch, 1852: synonym of Colubraria Schumacher, 1817 (not available from Agassiz, 1846)
 Floritula Olsson & Bayer, 1972: synonym of Metula H. Adams & A. Adams, 1853
 Fusus Helbling, 1779: synonym of Cumia Bivona, 1838 (Invalid: Placed by the ICZN on the Official Index by Opinion 1765, See Nomenclature note below.)
 Minitula Olsson & Bayer, 1972: synonym of Metula H. Adams & A. Adams, 1853
 Obex Iredale, 1925: synonym of Colubraria Schumacher, 1817
 Ratifusus Iredale, 1929: synonym of Cumia Bivona, 1838
 Roquesia Petuch, 2013: synonym of Colubraria Schumacher, 1817

References

 Bouchet P., Rocroi J.P., Hausdorf B., Kaim A., Kano Y., Nützel A., Parkhaev P., Schrödl M. & Strong E.E. (2017). Revised classification, nomenclator and typification of gastropod and monoplacophoran families. Malacologia. 61(1-2): 1–526.